Simon Nielsen (born 27 October 1986) is a Danish ice hockey professional goaltender who currently plays for Herning Blue Fox in the Metal Ligaen.

Personal life
Simon is the younger brother of Frans Nielsen, who plays forward for the Detroit Red Wings.

References

External links
 

1986 births
AaB Ishockey players
Amarillo Gorillas players
Danish ice hockey goaltenders
Herning Blue Fox players
Hokki players
Kassel Huskies players
Living people
Lørenskog IK players
Lukko players
Rødovre Mighty Bulls players
SaPKo players
People from Herning Municipality
Sportspeople from the Central Denmark Region